Bet v I allergen is a family of protein allergens.  Allergies are hypersensitivity reactions of the immune system to specific substances called allergens (such as pollen, stings, drugs, or food) that, in most people, result in no symptoms. 

Trees within the order Fagales possess particularly potent allergens, e.g. the prototypical Bet v 1, the major white birch (Betula verrucosa) pollen antigen. Bet v 1 is the main cause of type I allergies observed in early spring. Type I, or immunoglobulin E-mediated (IgE-mediated) allergies affect 1 in 5 people in Europe and North America. Commonly observed symptoms are hay fever, dermatitis, asthma and, in severe cases, anaphylactic shock. First contact with these allergens results in sensitisation; subsequent contact produces a cross-linking reaction of IgE on mast cells and concomitant release of histamine. The inevitable symptoms of an allergic reaction ensue.

Categorization
A nomenclature system has been established for antigens (allergens) that cause IgE-mediated atopic allergies in humans. This nomenclature system is defined by a designation that is composed of the first three letters of the genus; a space; the first letter of the species name; a space and an Arabic number. In the event that two species names have identical designations, they are discriminated from one another by adding one or more letters (as necessary) to each species designation.

The allergens in this family include allergens with the following designations: Bet v 1, Dau c 1, and Pru a 1.  Other proteins belonging to this family include the major pollen allergens:

 Aln g I from Alnus glutinosa (Alder);
 Api G I from Apium graveolens (Celery);
 Car b I from Carpinus betulus (European hornbeam);
 Cor a I from Corylus avellana (European hazel);
 Mal d I from Malus domestica (Apple).

Structure
NMR analysis has confirmed earlier predictions of the protein structure and site of the major T-cell epitope. The Bet v 1 protein comprises 6 anti-parallel beta-strands and 3 alpha-helices. Four of the strands dominate the global fold, and 2 of the helices form a C-terminal amphipathic helical motif. This motif is believed to be the T-cell epitope. However, one very striking feature of the three-dimensional structure of Bet v 1 is the presence of a large hydrophobic cavity, which is open to the exterior and probably functions as a ligand binding site.

The motif is also found in:

 the wound-induced protein AoPR1 from Asparagus officinalis (Garden asparagus);
 the pathogenesis-related proteins from Phaseolus vulgaris (Kidney bean) and Petroselinum crispum (Parsley) (PR1-1 and PR1-3);
 the disease resistance response proteins, STH-2 and STH-21, from Solanum tuberosum (Potato) and pI49, pI176 and DRRG49-C from Pisum sativum (Garden pea);
 the P.sativum abscisic acid-responsive proteins ABR17 and ABR18;
 and the stress-induced protein SAM22 from Glycine max (Soybean).

Additionally, the core domain of Bet v 1 founds or is part of a superfamily of domains called SRPBCC (START/RHOalphaC/PITP/Bet v1/CoxG/CalC) that include the StAR-related lipid-transfer (START) domain.

Function 
The biological function of Bet v 1 is still under investigations. Bet v 1 harbors a large hydrophobic pocket and is able to bind a large spectra of ligands in it like hormones and siderophores like flavonols. It belongs to the pathogenesis-related (PR) proteins, which are usually expressed upon infections and stressful conditions, implicating a role in host defense.  In vitro, Bet v 1 has been shown to be immune-suppressive, due to its ability to bind to iron-flavonoid complexes, which it can shuttle into human monocytic cells to increase their labile iron pool and stimulate the anti-inflammatory Arylhydrocarbon receptor pathway (https://www.mdpi.com/2076-3921/12/1/42). As such, only without any ligand, Bet v 1 was able to mount a Th2-response and turned into an allergen.

References

Allergology
Protein families